Florence Nakimbugwe Nsubuga (née Florence Nakimbugwe), but commonly known as Florence Nsubuga, is a Ugandan businesswoman and corporate executive, who since 2012, serves as the chief operating officer (COO) of Umeme Limited, the largest electricity distribution company in Uganda, whose stock trades of the Uganda Securities Exchange and on the Nairobi Stock Exchange. Effective March 2015, she concurrently serves as a member of the board of directors of Umeme.

Background and education
She was born in the Central Region of Uganda, circa 1973. She attended local schools for her elementary and secondary school education. She obtained a Bachelor of Commerce (BCom) degree, specializing in Marketing, from Makerere University in 1996. She went on to obtain a Master of Arts (MA) degree, in Economic policy planning, also from Makerere. As of November 2017, she was pursuing a Master of Business Administration (MBA) from the University of Edinburgh, in Scotland. She also has undergone executive training from the Harvard Business School.

Career
She began her career in 1996, at Uganda Electricity Distribution Company Limited (UEDCL), as a graduate trainee. When Umeme acquired the electricity distribution concession from UEDCL, she went with Umeme. Over the years, she was promoted until her appointment to the COO position in 2012. On the way to the top, she has served in various roles, including as (a) Delivery Controller (b) Regional Manager for Kampala East and (c) Outage Manager. In her capacity as COO of Umeme, she supervises 600 employees directly and another 1,000 people indirectly.

Other responsibilities
She is a married mother of two daughters, Sanyu and Suubi. In 2015, she won the Outstanding Woman in Energy - 2015 African Utility Week Award.

See also
 Agnes Konde
 Jolly Kaguhangire

References

External links
Power Thieves to be fined Shs100 million under the New Imposed Penalties as Umeme loses Shs70 billion Annually As of 12 May 2017.

1973 births
Living people
21st-century Ugandan businesswomen
21st-century Ugandan businesspeople
Makerere University alumni
Alumni of the University of Edinburgh
Chief operating officers
People from Central Region, Uganda
Ugandan women business executives